Troilus of Elis was an ancient Greek athlete from Elis who participated at the ancient Olympic Games. He gained controversy by being a referee who won two equestrian events at the 372 BC games. After that a law banned referees from competing. His story has at times been used to show the ancient games had a "win at any cost" mindset quite different from the modern Olympic ideal.

External links
Equestrian site
The Telegraph on how "Winning matters" at the Ancient Olympics
Ancient Olympic results without comment at Sikyon

Ancient Eleans
Ancient Olympic competitors
4th-century BC Greek people